PENTTBOM is the codename for the Federal Bureau of Investigation's probe into the September 11 attacks of 2001, the largest criminal inquiry in the FBI's history. Its name stands for "Pentagon/Twin Towers Bombing Investigation". The investigation was launched on September 11, 2001, and involved 4,000 special agents and 3,000 professional employees.

Identifying the hijackers
The FBI was able to identify the 19 hijackers within a matter of days as few suspects made any effort to conceal their names on flight, credit card, and other records.

Identical letters
Three of the hijackers carried copies of an identical handwritten letter (in Arabic) that was found in three separate locations: the first, in a suitcase of hijacker Mohamed Atta that did not make the connection to American Airlines Flight 11 that crashed into the North Tower of the World Trade Center; the second, in a vehicle parked at Washington Dulles International Airport that belonged to hijacker Nawaf al-Hazmi; and the third at the crash site of United Airlines Flight 93 in Shanksville, Pennsylvania.

According to the testimony before the House Intelligence Subcommittee on Terrorism and Homeland Defense on October 3, 2001 given by J. T. Caruso—the Deputy Assistant Director of the FBI's Counterterrorism Division, "translations of the letter indicate an alarming willingness to die on the part of the hijackers."

Passports recovered
According to testimony by Susan Ginsberg, a staff member of the National Commission on Terrorist attacks upon the United States, in the January 26, 2004, Public Hearing:
Four of the hijackers' passports have survived in whole or in part. Two were recovered from the crash site of United Airlines flight 93 in Pennsylvania. These are the passports of Ziad Jarrah and Saeed al Ghamdi. One belonged to a hijacker on American Airlines flight 11. This is the passport of Satam al Suqami. A passerby picked it up and gave it to a NYPD detective shortly before the World Trade Center towers collapsed. A fourth passport was recovered from luggage that did not make it from a Portland flight to Boston on to the connecting flight which was American Airlines flight 11. This is the passport of Abdul Aziz al Omari.
In addition to these four, some digital copies of the hijackers passports were recovered in post-9/11 operations. Two of the passports that have survived, those of Satam al Suqami and Abdul Aziz al Omari, were clearly doctored. These passports were manipulated in a fraudulent manner in ways that have been associated with al Qaeda.

WTC site
The passport of hijacker Satam al-Suqami was found a few blocks from the World Trade Center.

Flight 93
According to the 9/11 Commission, the passports of two of the Flight 93 hijackers were also found intact in the aircraft's debris field.

Atta's luggage
The doctored passport of hijacker Abdulaziz Alomari was found in Mohamed Atta's left-behind luggage.

When examining Mohamed Atta's luggage, the FBI found important clues about the hijackers and their plans. His luggage contained papers that revealed the identity of all 19 hijackers, and provided information about their plans, motives, and backgrounds.  The FBI was able to determine details such as dates of birth, known and/or possible residences, visa statuses, and specific identities of the suspected pilots. None of these documents have been scrutinized by independent legal experts.

Linking the hijackers to al Qaeda
The investigators were quickly able to link the 19 men to the terrorist organization al Qaeda, by accessing their intelligence agency files. The New York Times reported on September 12 that: "Authorities said they had also identified accomplices in several cities who had helped plan and execute Tuesday's attacks. Officials said they knew who these people were and important biographical details about many of them. They prepared biographies of each identified member of the hijack teams, and began tracing the recent movements of the men." FBI agents in Florida investigating the hijackers quickly "descended on flight schools, neighborhoods and restaurants in pursuit of leads." At one flight school, "students said investigators were there within hours of Tuesday's attacks." The Washington Post later reported that "In the hours after Tuesday's bombings, investigators searched their files on [Satam] Al Suqami and [Ahmed] Alghamdi, noted the pair's ties to [Nabil] al-Marabh and launched a hunt for him."

On September 27, 2001, the FBI released photos of the 19 hijackers, along with information about the possible nationalities and aliases of many.

On the day of the attacks, U.S. intelligence agencies also intercepted communications that pointed to Osama bin Laden. It was quickly asserted that Osama bin Laden was responsible for the attacks, and other suspects were ruled out. Although he denied the attacks at first, Osama bin Laden later admitted full and sole responsibility for the attacks in a video tape.

Press releases
September 11, 2001: FBI opens investigations
September 14: FBI releases list of 9/11 hijacker suspects
September 27: FBI releases photographs of 9/11 hijacker suspects
September 28: FBI releases four-page letter believed to be written by the hijackers
October 4: FBI releases partial timeline for Boston-based hijackers

See also

Responsibility for the September 11, 2001 attacks

References

External links
 FBI's 9/11 Team Still Hard at Work from The Washington Post June 14, 2004
 FBI PENTTBOM suspects
 Translation of hijacker letters
 PENTTBOM timeline

Criminal investigation
Federal Bureau of Investigation
Proceedings surrounding the September 11 attacks